Dierna patibulum is a moth of the family Noctuidae first described by Johan Christian Fabricius in 1794. It is found in Sri Lanka.

References

External links
Images

Moths of Asia
Moths described in 1794